Casola in Lunigiana is a comune (municipality) in the Province of Massa and Carrara in the Italian region Tuscany, located about  northwest of Florence and about  north of Massa.

Main sights
Church of Santa Felicita. Known from the late 13th century, it was later restored in Baroque style.
Pieve of Sts. Cornelio e Cipriano, at Codiponte. Probably existing before 793 AD, it includes a basilica with a nave and two aisles, dating from the 12th century. 
Pieve of San Pietro, at Offiano. Of Romanesque origin, it was modified in Baroque style in the 18th century. 
Church of Santa Margherita, at Regnano 
Church of Sant'Andrea (15th century), at Ugliancaldo.

References

Cities and towns in Tuscany